Jean-Philippe Gbamin (born 25 September 1995) is an Ivorian professional footballer who plays as a defensive midfielder for  club Trabzonspor, on loan from  club Everton, and the Ivory Coast national team.

Club career

Lens
Born in San Pédro, Ivory Coast, Gbamin had spells with French clubs Aire-sur-la-Lys and US Saint-Quentin Blessy, before joining Lens in 2007. In 2013, Gbamin broke into the first team after impressing in the second team, making his debut on 10 May in a 7–0 defeat against Guingamp, in which he replaced Alexandre Coeff fourteen minutes in. Gbamin was assigned the number 25 ahead of the 2013–14 Ligue 2 campaign. On 17 August 2013, Gbamin was given his first Lens start by manager Antoine Kombouaré in a 4–1 victory against Auxerre. Gbamin started to make his Lens breakthrough towards the end of the 2013–14 campaign, assisting them in their promotion to Ligue 1.

Mainz 05
On 13 July 2016, Gbamin joined Bundesliga side Mainz 05 on a five-year contract. He made 86 appearances for Mainz over the following three seasons, featuring at both the defensive midfield and center back positions.

Everton
Gbamin signed for Premier League club Everton on 2 August 2019 on a five-year contract for a £25 million fee. He made appearances in the club's first two games of the season, before being ruled out for eight weeks due to a thigh injury. In October, it was announced Gbamin would be out injured until January 2020 after having surgery on a thigh injury, but in January he suffered a further setback when additional surgery would keep him out until the end of the season. In May, he injured an Achilles tendon in training, with it estimated he would be injured until November.

Everton Manager Carlo Ancelotti stated during an interview in January 2021 that he was hopeful to have Gbamin back in training as soon as possible, but stressed the need for patience with his recovery, insisting he had a role to play in the team despite an extended spell on the sidelines. On 5 April, Gbamin came on as a substitute for James Rodríguez in Everton’s 1–1 home league draw against Crystal Palace, making his first appearance for the club since August 2019 due to injury, but a week later Gbamin would again be sidelined following a knee injury.

Gbamin made a return from injury in October 2021 when he was listed for selection on the Everton bench for three successive Premier League games. Then on the 2nd of November 2021 Gbamin was listed on Everton’s starting 11 to face off against Wolverhampton Wanderers F.C. away from home.

CSKA Moscow loan
On 21 February 2022, CSKA Moscow announced the loan signing of Gbamin until the end of the season. On 19 May 2022, CSKA confirmed that Gbamin will leave the club upon the expiration of his loan term.

International career
Gbamin has represented France at under-18, under-19, under-20 and under-21 level, making his under-21 debut in a 1–1 draw against Italy U20 on 13 November 2014.

Gbamin is also eligible to represent Ivory Coast at international level due to his parents' nationalities and his birthplace. In April 2017, it was announced that Gbamin had committed himself to playing for the Ivory Coast internationally. He made his senior debut for Ivory Coast in a 5–0 friendly loss to the Netherlands on 4 June 2017.

Honours
France U19
UEFA European Under-19 Championship runner-up:2013

Career statistics

International

References

External links
 
 

1995 births
Living people
People from San-Pédro, Ivory Coast
French footballers
French sportspeople of Ivorian descent
Ivorian emigrants to France
France youth international footballers
France under-21 international footballers
Ivorian footballers
Ivory Coast international footballers
Association football midfielders
RC Lens players
1. FSV Mainz 05 players
Everton F.C. players
PFC CSKA Moscow players
Championnat National 2 players
Ligue 2 players
Ligue 1 players
Bundesliga players
Premier League players
Russian Premier League players
2019 Africa Cup of Nations players
French expatriate footballers
Ivorian expatriate footballers
French expatriate sportspeople in England
French expatriate sportspeople in Germany
French expatriate sportspeople in Russia
Ivorian expatriate sportspeople in England
Ivorian expatriate sportspeople in Germany
Ivorian expatriate sportspeople in Russia
Expatriate footballers in England
Expatriate footballers in Germany
Expatriate footballers in Russia